Chhendipada is a Vidhan Sabha constituency of Angul district, Odisha.

This constituency includes Chhendipada block and 12 GPs (Kandasar, Badakerajang, Jarasingha, Kanjara, Karadagadia, Kukudang, Kumand, Kurudol, Sakosingha, Sanakerajang, Tubey and Santrapur) of Banarpal block.

In 2009 election, Biju Janata Dal candidate Khageswar Behera defeated Indian National Congress candidate Agasti Behera by a margin of 4,906 votes.

Elected Members

Six elections were held between 1961 and 2009 inclusive. Elected members from the Chhendipada constituency are:

2019: (62): Susanta Kumar Behera (BJD)
2014: (62): Susanta Kumar Behera (BJD)
2009: (62): Khageswar Behera (Biju Janata Dal|BJD)
1971: (138): Bhajaman Behera (Utkal Congress)
1967: (138): Nabaghana Nayak (Jana Congress)
1961: (78): Pada Nayak (Congress)

2019 Election Result

2014 Election Result
In 2014 election, Biju Janata Dal candidate Sujit Kumar Behera defeated Indian National Congress candidate Agasti Behera by a margin of 9,807 votes.

Summary of results of the 2009 Election

Notes

References

Assembly constituencies of Odisha
Politics of Angul district